The county of Kent is divided into 13 districts. The districts of Kent are Ashford, Canterbury, Dartford, Dover, Gravesham, Maidstone, Medway, Tonbridge and Malling, Tunbridge Wells, Sevenoaks, Shepway, Swale and Thanet.

As there are 435 Grade I listed buildings in the county they have been split into separate lists for each district.

 Grade I listed buildings in Ashford (borough)
 Grade I listed buildings in City of Canterbury
 Grade I listed buildings in Dartford (borough)
 Grade I listed buildings in Dover (district)
 Grade I listed buildings in Folkestone and Hythe
 Grade I listed buildings in Gravesham
 Grade I listed buildings in Maidstone
 Grade I listed buildings in Medway
 Grade I listed buildings in Sevenoaks District
 Grade I listed buildings in Swale
 Grade I listed buildings in Thanet
 Grade I listed buildings in Tonbridge and Malling
 Grade I listed buildings in Tunbridge Wells (borough)

See also
 Grade II* listed buildings in Kent

See also
 :Category:Grade I listed buildings in Kent

References
English Heritage Images of England

 
Lists of Grade I listed buildings in Kent